TEM (Greek: Τοπική Εναλλακτική Μονάδα ("Alternative Monetary Unit"); abbrv: TEM ) is a local exchange trading system (LETS) popular in Volos, Magnesia, Greece.

See also

European sovereign-debt crisis
Local exchange trading system
Ovolos, a similar system in Patras, Greece.

References

External links
Official Site (Greek)

Local currencies
DIY culture
Freiwirtschaft
Mutualism (movement)